New Place, Shirrell Heath, Shedfield, Hampshire, England, is a former county house, now a hotel, designed by Edwin Lutyens. It is a Grade I listed building.

History

New Place was commissioned by Mrs A. S. Franklyn in 1904. Resident in nearby Shedfield, Mrs Franklyn had inherited a large early 17th Century mansion, 12, Welsh Back, Bristol, which was scheduled for demolition. Wanting a new home in which to incorporate elements salvaged from the Bristol house, and to commemorate her ancestral connections with William Shakespeare, in 1904 she commissioned Edwin Lutyens to design a new house, named after New Place in Stratford-upon-Avon. The house was complete by 1906, with the contract for completion signed in a week in May of that year when Lutyens finalised four contracts on the same day. He described his triumph in a letter to his wife, written while on a train to Devon: "Hemingway has signed contract for £17,500, Dolgorouki accepts £15,000, Birds £7800, Mrs Franklin (sic) £9300. So this week, signed and sealed, £34,600". In 1908, Mrs Franklyn gave the house to her son, Henry Arden Franklyn, whose middle name recalled the family's Shakespearean connections through their descent from Shakespeare's mother, Mary Arden. In the 1950s, the house was sold and housed a prep school. Since the 1980s, it has operated as a hotel, under a number of managing companies.

Architecture and description
The house is built entirely of dark-red brick, from the brickworks at Danehill, Hampshire. The central block is of two storeys, with three-story matching wings. The style is Jacobethan and Lutyens originally intended that the E-plan house would have stepped gables, styled after Montacute House in Somerset, but these were not constructed. The interior contains substantial fittings from Mrs Franklyn's Bristol mansion, including fireplaces, over mantels, doorcases, panelling and a staircase.  Lutyens admitted subsequently that he "did not much like the house", which is now a Grade I listed building.

Footnotes

References

Sources

External links

Grade I listed buildings in Hampshire
Grade I listed houses
Country houses in Hampshire
Houses completed in 1906
Works of Edwin Lutyens in England
1906 establishments in England